Palliyarai  is a Tamil word used for the Sanctum Sanctoram in Hindu temples, the equivalent of garbhagriha in Sanscritic or Indo-Aryan languages. It generally means the place for divine resting and is considered very holy by the Hindus. In many traditional Hindu temples, during the final pooja (prayer) of the day, the goddess is typically escorted to the residing place of her divine husband, and this generally happens around 9 PM in many temples. For example, in Meenakshi temple in Madurai and Chidambaram

This event receives thousands of devotees everyday, and would include a procession by the deities around the inner corridors of the temple with great pomp and music. The first prayer of the day, when the gates of the Lord are opened, is generally called the "Thirupalliezhuchi" (meaning, waking up from divine rest) and is celebrated elaborately in Vishnu temples like Srirangam and Tirupathi. In some of the temples, a mirror is also placed behind the main deity.

References

External links
Typical pooja schedule in a famous Hindu temple

Hindu temple architecture